The 1991–92 Copa del Rey was the 90th staging of the Spanish Cup.

The competition started on 21 August 1991 and concluded on 27 June 1992 with the Final, held at the Santiago Bernabéu Stadium in Madrid, in which Atlético Madrid lifted the trophy with a 2–0 victory over Real Madrid.

First round

Second round

Third round

Fourth round

 Bye: Sevilla FC

Fifth round

Round of 16

First leg

Second leg

Quarter-finals

First leg

Second leg

Semi-finals

First leg

Second leg

Final

External links
1991–92 Cup results, at LinguaSport
1991–92 Cup results, at BDFutbol

Copa del Rey seasons
1991–92 in Spanish football cups